Tiruppattur Venkatachalamurti Ramakrishnan  (born 14 August 1941) is an Indian theoretical physicist known for his contributions in condensed matter physics. He is at present DAE Homi Bhabha Professor of Physics at Benaras Hindu University and also the chancellor of Tripura University.

Biography
Tiruppattur Venkatachalamurti Ramakrishnan was born on 14 August 1941 in Madras, Tamil Nadu. He completed his B.Sc (Hons.) and M.Sc in Physics from Banaras Hindu University in 1959 and 1961. He then worked as a CSIR research fellow at Banaras Hindu University from 1961 to 1962. He later completed his Ph.D. from Columbia University in 1966.
He started his professional career as lecturer in the Indian Institute of Technology, Kanpur. He shifted to the Indian Institute of Science, Bangalore in 1986 where he continued till 2003. He also served on the Physical Sciences jury for the Infosys Prize from 2010 to 2013.

Ramakrishnan has made seminal contributions to the scaling theory of electron localization. He has made contributions to the theory of liquid to solid transition and of mixed valence systems.

Awards and honours
He was awarded the Shanti Swarup Bhatnagar Award in 1983, TWAS Prize in 1990 and the Padma Shri in 2001. In 1987 he was elected a Fellow of the American Physical Society "for his contributions to the many-body theory of disordered systems, especially the scaling theory of localization and the theory of mixed-valent impurities" 

Ramakrishnan was elected a Fellow of the Royal Society (FRS) in 2000. His certificate of election reads:

References

1941 births
Living people
20th-century Indian physicists
Scientists from Chennai
Recipients of the Shanti Swarup Bhatnagar Award in Physical Science
Fellows of the American Physical Society
Fellows of the Royal Society
Banaras Hindu University alumni
Academic staff of Banaras Hindu University
Indian condensed matter physicists
Academic staff of the Indian Institute of Science
Recipients of the Padma Shri in science & engineering
TWAS laureates
Rare earth scientists